The White Queen is a British historical drama television drama serial developed for BBC One. It is based on Philippa Gregory's historical novel series The Cousins' War (The White Queen, The Red Queen, and The Kingmaker's Daughter). The first episode premiered on BBC One on 16 June 2013 in the United Kingdom. It was first broadcast in the United States on Starz on 9 August 2013.

The drama is set against the backdrop of the Wars of the Roses and presents the story of the women involved in the long conflict for the throne of England. It starts in 1464; the nation has been at war for nine years fighting over who is the rightful king as two sides of the same family, the House of York and the House of Lancaster, contest the throne. The story follows three women, Elizabeth Woodville, Margaret Beaufort and Anne Neville, who manipulate events behind the scenes of history to gain power. Elizabeth Woodville is the protagonist in the novel The White Queen, and Margaret Beaufort and Anne Neville are the focus of the novels The Red Queen and The Kingmaker's Daughter; the three characters appear in the three novels that make up the television drama.

The final episode of The White Queen aired on 18 August 2013 and the drama was released on DVD and Blu-ray Disc the following day. Two days later, it was confirmed that The White Queen would not be returning for a second series. In a statement to Broadcast, the BBC stated that the show was always planned as a one-series serial miniseries. In October 2013, The Telegraph reported that Starz planned to develop a sequel called The White Princess, based on Gregory's 2013 novel of the same name. Gregory confirmed that the project was underway in August 2015. On 7 February 2016, Gregory announced on Facebook that the sequel was officially confirmed to be in production, with the scripts being written. On 15 March 2018, Starz announced that it would create a continuation of The White Queen and The White Princess to be titled The Spanish Princess, which would be based on Gregory's novels The Constant Princess and The King's Curse and centre on Catherine of Aragon.

The White Queen was nominated for three Golden Globe Awards, four Primetime Emmy Awards and a People's Choice Award.

Cast

Main

 Juliet Aubrey as Lady Anne Beauchamp, Countess of Warwick, wife of Warwick and mother to Lady Isabel and Lady Anne
 Veerle Baetens as Margaret of Anjou, queen consort to Henry VI of England
 Aneurin Barnard as Richard III of England
 Leo Bill as Sir Reginald Bray
 Emily Berrington as Jane Shore, Edward IV's mistress
 Ashley Charles as Thomas Grey, the eldest son of Elizabeth Woodville and Sir John Grey of Groby
 Arthur Darvill as Henry Stafford, Duke of Buckingham
 Shaun Dooley as Sir Robert Brackenbury
 Rebecca Ferguson as Elizabeth Woodville, the "White Queen" and consort to Edward IV
 James Frain as Richard Neville, 16th Earl of Warwick, "the Kingmaker"
 Caroline Goodall as Cecily Neville, Duchess of York, mother of Edward, George, and Richard
 Andrew Gower as Lord Strange, son of Lord Stanley
 Rupert Graves as Lord Stanley, the fourth husband of Lady Margaret Beaufort
 Amanda Hale as Lady Margaret Beaufort, mother of Henry Tudor, a great-granddaughter of John, Duke of Lancaster
 Max Irons as Edward IV of England
 Michael Jenn as Dr Lewis
 Ben Lamb as Anthony Woodville, 2nd Earl Rivers
 Michael Maloney as Sir Henry Stafford, third husband of Lady Margaret Beaufort
 Michael Marcus as Henry Tudor, later Henry VII of England; son and heir of Lady Margaret Beaufort by Sir Edmund Tudor
 Faye Marsay as Lady Anne Neville, "the Kingmaker's Daughter" and queen consort to Richard III
 Freya Mavor as Elizabeth of York, eldest daughter and child to Edward IV and Elizabeth Woodville
 Lizzy McInnerny as Lady Sutcliffe
 Tom McKay as Jasper Tudor, half-brother of Henry VI, brother-in-law to Lady Margaret Beaufort and uncle to Henry Tudor
 Janet McTeer as Jacquetta, Lady Rivers, Elizabeth Woodville's mother
 David Oakes as George, Duke of Clarence, brother of Edward IV
 Eve Ponsonby as Mary Woodville
 Robert Pugh as Baron Rivers (later Earl Rivers), father of Elizabeth Woodville
 Frances Tomelty as Lady Beauchamp, mother of Lady Margaret Beaufort
 Eleanor Tomlinson as Lady Isabel Neville, Duchess of Clarence, wife of George, Duke of Clarence and elder sister of Lady Anne Neville
 Rupert Young as Sir William Herbert, Lord Pembroke

Recurring
 David Shelley as Henry VI of England
 Hugh Mitchell as Richard Welles, half-brother of Lady Margaret Beaufort
 Nicholas Fagg and Otto Farrant as Thomas Grey
 Rudi Goodman and Dean-Charles Chapman as Richard Grey, son of Elizabeth Woodville and Sir John Grey of Groby
 Oscar Kennedy as young Henry Tudor
 Joey Batey as Edward of Lancaster, son of Henry VI and Margaret of Anjou, married to Lady Anne Neville
 Elinor Crawley as Cecily of York, daughter to Edward IV and Elizabeth Woodville
 Sonny Ashbourne Serkis as the Prince of Wales (later King Edward V), eldest son and heir to Edward IV and Elizabeth Woodville; later one of the Princes in the Tower

The large majority of the cast is British, but since the drama was shot in Belgium, several local actors are featured: Veerle Baetens, Jurgen Delnaet, Joren Seldeslachts, Elsa Houben, Ben Forceville and Ben Van den Heuvel all appear in the serial. Rebecca Ferguson who portrays Elizabeth Woodville, the White Queen, is from Sweden (her mother is originally from England).

Production
The budget was £25 million and took 120 days to shoot, consisting of 250 sets including: dungeons, palaces, castles, 12 state banquets and at least two coronations.

Filming began in September 2012 and lasted until March 2013.

Two versions were made, one for the BBC and a more sexually explicit version for the US.

A companion two-part documentary series, The Real White Queen and Her Rivals, presented by Philippa Gregory, was made to accompany the series. It was broadcast on BBC Two on 17 and 24 July 2013.

Credits
 Executive producers: John Griffin, George Faber, Charles Pattinson for Company Pictures, Eurydice Gysel for Czar Television, Polly Hill for the BBC, Philippa Gregory and Colin Callender.
 Series lead writer: Emma Frost and produced by Company Pictures. Lisa McGee and Nicole Taylor are also writers.
 James Kent directed the first three episodes.
 Other episodes were directed by Jamie Payne and Colin Teague.
 Cinematographer: Jean Philippe Gossart. and David Luther.
 Music: John Lunn.

Locations
The White Queen was filmed on location in Belgium, where several landmarks in Bruges and Ghent represent locations in London and elsewhere:
 The Gothic Hall in Bruges City Hall represents Westminster Hall
 The Church of Our Lady in Bruges represents St Stephen's Chapel in the old Palace of Westminster
 Heilige Geeststraat in Bruges represents a medieval London street
 The Basilica of the Holy Blood in Bruges represents the Tower of London
 In Ghent filming took place in the Castle of the Counts (Gravensteen), Saint Peter's Abbey (Sint-Pietersabdij), Saint Bavo's Abbey (Sint-Baafsabdij), Cloth hall (Lakenhalle), Castle of Gerald the Devil (Geeraard de Duivelsteen), Saint Bavo Cathedral (Sint-Baafskathedraal), and Agustijnklooster (Academiestraat).
 Additional filming took place at Rumbeke, in Damme, and at Ursel Airfield – 23 locations for the first three episodes. The rest of the set was constructed at a nearby Philips factory.

Episodes

Historical accuracy
A number of anachronisms and historical inaccuracies received attention, especially in the costumes and locations used. Pat Stacey of the Irish Evening Herald, said that "the historical howlers are piling up like bodies on a battlefield, week after week", comparing it to the "flaws" spotted by "nitpickers" in Downton Abbey and Foyle's War.

Bernadette McNulty, of The Daily Telegraph, commented that in the final episode, the Battle of Bosworth Field appears to take place in a forest rather than a field. Mary McNamara, of the Los Angeles Times, states that in order to fit thirty years of history into ten episodes, "years collapse into minutes, intricate policy is condensed into cardboard personalities, and the characters are swiftly categorized as good or evil".

Others questioned the depiction of the major characters. Amy Licence, Cecily's biographer, states that Cecily Neville, Duchess of York, is portrayed in the first episode as "straight from the pages of a novel rather than the actual proud aristocrat who asserted her own right to rule". Historian Michael Hicks commented, "They've fiddled with the chronology" but added, "I can see why they decided to restrict the cast of characters, and play up the rivalry between Elizabeth and the Earl of Warwick", and also said "As with Philippa Gregory's source novels, they've done their research".

In response to criticisms of the series being "ahistorical", Gregory stated that

What [BBC One and Starz] wanted was not a historical series based on the documents from the War of the Roses. They wanted my take on it, so that's what they got. 

Aneurin Barnard (who played Richard) stated, with regard to inaccuracies,

...the truth can be pretty boring. You have to up the stakes and make something up or twist it to make it a little bit more exciting

Reception
On Metacritic the show has a score of 70 based on reviews from 14 critics.

Reception in the UK
In the UK the critical reception was described as “mixed at best” and 'mostly scathing'. Sam Wollaston of The Guardian praised the characters, suggesting Janet McTeer (Jacquetta) stole the show. He also praised the romantic elements, commenting "Mmmm, steamy". Gerard O'Donovan of The Daily Telegraph praised the casting of the supporting characters and the exciting "lust and vengeance" fuelling the drama, but objected to the prettified portrayal of 15th century England. The Independent'''s Tom Sutcliffe found it "less historically plausible than Game of Thrones", but concluded that "I’m sure it will give innocent pleasure to many". Barbara Ellen in The Observer, compared the show to "a strange Timotei advert, featuring fornication, shouting, horses, armour", whilst commenting that the sex scenes, toned down in the British version, "were so vanilla, I ended up fancying an ice cream".

Reviewing the final episode for The Daily Telegraph, Bernadette McNulty stated that the series, "fell between two stools—not serious enough for the scholars nor glitzy enough for the Game of Thrones fans". The ratings were however good. The first episode received 6 million viewers, stabilising at around the 4–4.5 million mark from the second episode, although occasionally it dipped below this on first broadcast figures.

Reception in the USThe White Queen received generally positive reviews after airing on the Starz network on 10 August 2013. Joanne Ostrow of The Denver Post described the drama as "Sexy, empowering and violent". Linda Stasi of the New York Post agreed that the programme was a hit, saying "The White Queen [is] a royal winner". It was again unfavourably compared to HBO's high budget and fast-paced Game of Thrones. In comparison to Game of Thrones Neil Genzlinger speculated that "even if dragons were allowed, they’d mostly be lounging around and, between bouts of relatively tame dragon sex, talking about eating people rather than actually eating them". The performances of Janet McTeer and James Frain were praised by several American reviewers. Amanda Hale, despite receiving praise for her performance by British reviewers, was unfavourably reviewed by US critic Matthew Gilbert. He said "There were moments when I rolled my eyes—Amanda Hale, as the mother of young Henry Tudor, looks as if she is going to explode with ill intent. Really, her performance could be transposed into a Mel Brooks spoof". Louise Mellor of Den of Geek added "Why does Lady Margaret Beaufort constantly look like she is sucking on a Murray Mint?" TV Guide writer Matt Roush praised Hale's performance as "intense", and favoured the drama, labelling it as "fun", and on a one to ten scale, ranking it at seven.The White Queen was nominated three times at the 71st Golden Globe Awards, with acting nominations for Ferguson and McTeer and an overall nomination for the miniseries in the Best Miniseries or Television Film category.

AccoladesThe White Queen was nominated for several awards including three Golden Globe Awards, four Primetime Emmy Awards and a People's Choice Award for Favorite TV Movie/Miniseries.

71st Golden Globe Awards (2014)
 Best Mini-Series or Motion Picture Made for Television
 Best Performance by an Actress in a Mini-Series or a Motion Picture Made for Television – (Rebecca Ferguson)
 Best Performance by an Actress in a Supporting Role in a Series, Mini-Series or Motion Picture Made for Television – (Janet McTeer)

66th Primetime Emmy Awards (2014)
 Outstanding Miniseries

66th Primetime Creative Arts Emmy Awards (2014)
 Outstanding Music Composition for a Miniseries, Movie or a Special (Original Dramatic Score) – For episode: " The Final Battle"
 Outstanding Costumes for a Miniseries, Movie, or Special – For episode: "The Price of Power"
 Outstanding Hairstyling for a Miniseries or Movie

40th People's Choice Awards (2014)
 Favorite TV Movie/Miniseries

2014 Saturn Awards – Academy of Science Fiction, Fantasy & Horror Films
 SBest Television Release on DVD/Blu-ray

2014 ASC Award – American Society of Cinematographers
 Outstanding Achievement in Cinematography in Television Movie/Mini-Series – David Luther for Episode: "War at First Hand" (nomination)

OFTA Television Awards 2014 – Online Film & Television Association
 Best Miniseries

Satellite Awards 2013
 Best Miniseries or Motion Picture Made for Television

Home media releases

Sequels
The White Princess

Despite initial plans for a follow-up series, on 20 August 2013 the BBC announced they were not commissioning one, possibly due to the lukewarm reception the series received. However, in October 2013,The Telegraph reported that Starz was planning to develop a sequel miniseries called The White Princess, based on Gregory's 2013 novel of the same name.

Starz CEO Chris Albrecht announced in January 2014 that the network was working with White Queen screenwriter Emma Frost on the project. Starz would produce the White Princess miniseries without involvement from the BBC. Gregory confirmed that the project was underway in August 2015. On 7 February 2016, Gregory announced on Facebook that the sequel was officially confirmed to be in production, with the scripts being written. Production on the eight-episode miniseries began in June 2016. It aired weekly on Starz from 6 April to 4 June 2017.

The Spanish Princess

On 15 March 2018, Starz announced that it would create a continuation of The White Queen and The White Princess to be titled The Spanish Princess, which would be based on Gregory's novels The Constant Princess and The King's Curse and centre on Catherine of Aragon. It premiered on 5 May 2019.

See also
 The Hollow Crown (TV series)

References

External links
 
 The White Queen'' at Starz
 

2010s British drama television series
2013 British television series debuts
2013 British television series endings
BBC television dramas
BBC television royalty dramas
English-language television shows
Television series by All3Media
Television shows based on British novels
Television series about the history of England
Television series set in the 15th century
Television series set in the Middle Ages
Works about women in war